Un rostro en el pasado is a Mexican telenovela produced by Telesistema Mexicano in 1960.

Cast 
 Sara García
 Gloria Marín
 Eduardo Fajardo
 Nicolás Rodríguez
 Héctor Gómez 
 Dalia Íñiguez
 Magda Donato
 Julio Monterde

Production 
Original Story:  Fernanda Villeli
Adaptation:  Fernanda Villeli
Direct by:  Rafael Banquells
 Produced by: Colgate-Palmolive
 Producer/Director: Leopoldo Labra

References

External links 

1960 telenovelas
Mexican telenovelas
Televisa telenovelas
Television shows set in Mexico
1960 Mexican television series debuts
1960 Mexican television series endings
Spanish-language telenovelas